Regional elections were held in Scotland on Thursday 3 May 1990, as part of the Local Government (Scotland) Act 1973, and were the first test of public opinion on the Community Charge, which had been introduced in Scotland in 1989.

National results

|-
!colspan=2|Parties
!Votes
!Votes %
!+/-
!Wards
!NetGain/Loss
|-
| 
|729,922
|44.0
|
|223
|
|-
| 
|372,770
|21.8
|
|42
|
|-
| 
|333,823
|19.2
|
|52
|
|-
| 
|147,122
|8.0
|
|40
|
|-
| 
|76,516
|5
|
|73
|
|-
| 
|35,048
|2
|
|1
|
|-
|
|Other Parties
|15,140
|2
|
|4
|
|-
|}

Party performance
The Labour Party dominated the election, gaining the most seats and votes, even though their total vote was slightly down compared with 1986. This was the last election fought under the leadership of Margaret Thatcher, and her Conservative Party suffered a decline of 13 seats, mainly due to the introduction of the unpopular Poll Tax in 1989. The Conservative Government had recently given tax concessions to ratepayers in England and Wales, excluding Scotland, with criticism extended in particular to then-Secretary of State for Scotland Malcolm Rifkind, who was portrayed to not care about the interests of Scotland.

The newly formed Social and Liberal Democrats (a merger of the SDP and Liberals) fared badly, dropping 6.4% of the vote that the Alliance had taken at the previous election. Despite this, they stayed stationary on 40 seats. 
The Scottish National Party, once again the second-largest party in terms of vote share, benefitted from modest gains to take almost  22% of the vote. The Scottish Greens gained their first ever councillor in the Highland region. Turnout was marginally up 0.3% to 45.9%.

Results by council area

References

 
Ele
1990
May 1990 events in the United Kingdom